These are the many characters from Kaiketsu Zorori by Yutaka Hara.

Main Characters and Special Status

Voiced by: Koichi Yamadera (Japanese, TV series); Russell Wait (English, TV series), Jack Murphy (English, singing).

The fox protagonist of the story and a wanted criminal (after ).

Zorori's Apprentices 

/ Voiced by: Rikako Aikawa (Japanese, TV series), Masako Nozawa (Japanese, TV series; temporary, February–April 2006); Candice Moore (English, TV series)
The older of the boar twins with the deeper voice.
/  Voiced by: Motoko Kumai (Japanese, TV series), Sanae Kobayashi (Japanese, TV series; temporary, January 2007); Muriel Hofmann (English, TV series)
The younger of the boar twins with the higher voicee. He also has a mole on his right cheek.

Zorori's Family 

Zorori's mother. Zorori promised her that he would accomplish his goals. She now resides in Heaven. 

A treasure hunter and biplane pilot. He's implied to be Zorori's father.

Creators 
/ Voiced by: himself
The creator of Kaiketsu Zorori, Yutaka Hara appears in every episode, often in the background.

 Voiced by: herself
The wife of Yutaka Hara. She appears in the movies.

Demon School

Yōkai-sensei for short. He teaches different monsters and demons how to scare people. Like Zorori, he debuted in Hōrensō Man

Students
 
During the day, he transports via a coffin. He tries to overcome his repulsion to garlic.

An already canid man who becomes more beastly and canid during a full moon. He wears a green jacket and has a round nose. In the anime, there are two other wolfmen; one with a yellow jacket and square nose and another with a purple jacket and triangle nose. 
 
A mummy covered in bandages. 
 
She wears shades. 

A raijin who wasn't fond of Zorori at first but then grew to like him. 
 
Kappas dressed as Hanako-san. They're part of the soccer team.
 
An octopus monster in the soccer team.
 
The soccer team's goalie.

An orange blob like creature with many eyes. 

He has poor eyesight and uses contacts. 
 
She scares people with the sound of her azuki beans. 

He licks grime with his tongue. 
  
He used to be 10 meters tall, but now he's small and shriveled. 
 
An elderly raijin who used to make lightning of a million volts. 
 
Due to change in climate, she lost her ability to scare people. She's scarier as her face whitens. She is also a big fan of Zorori. 
 
Junk food made her neck fat. 
 
Pollution made her webs less sticky and more breakable. She eats nattou to help solve this. 
 
Her floral pattern looks like eyes in the dark. 

 
A cowardly kappa. 

Freddy's girlfriend who helps Freddy become less cowardly.

Restores
The school's baseball team. They spent three consecutive years at the lowest rank of the Monster Major League.

 
A mononoke capable of pitching the ball at more than 200 km/hr, but can't control them.
 
An octopus monster who bats with three hands. His appendages do not work well. 

He extends his neck to keep track of the ball, but never catches the ball because his arms do not extend. 
 
A batter with a 40% batting average. He will not hit if he gets cold. His breath can freeze things. 

He's only interested in making home runs and only bats when he gets the chance.
Others
These players were absent during the events of Book 33 due to injuries.

Originally from Hōrensō Man
In the anime, they appear in the three part finale of Season 2.

 
His entire body is a liquid substance. 
 
A short brown cat like creature. 
 
He walks on six limbs. He uses four limbs as arms. He has several around his head. 

 
A chef with long fangs. 
 
A three eyed eight armed monster with a beret.

Secondary Characters

Books 1-10
 
A panther prince who marries Elzie. 
 
Princess of Levanna Country. 
 
Father of Elzie. 

A bulldog who runs an oden stand. 

A robot dragon used for Zorori's scheme in capturing Elzie and luring Arthur. 

A hippopotamus mayor. He was initially pleased with the yokai. 

A giant robot modeled after a jiangshi.

A wizard who uses a magic rod to terrorize a town. He is later revealed to be a tanuki child. 
  
A bat the wizard combined with an umbrella.
 
A hippo the wizard combined with a bag. In the 1993 movie, the hippo was male, but female in the anime series.
  
A squirrel the wizard combined with a slipper.
 
A mouse the wizard combined with an earthworm.
  
A  the wizard combined with underwear.
 
The son of a pirate captain. When he was first introduced he was a lion cub, but for the rest of the series he is a teenager. He has his own toy car store.

Paru's father.
 
Paru's former first mate. He committed mutiny and became the pirate captain. His left hand is mechanical.
Pirate Henchmen
The Ship Captain's henchmen, but after the captain is killed off, they become Tiger's henchmen.
Creatures of the Ghost Ship
 
A creature wearing a cloth with sea urchins attached. He can launch them.  
 
Jellyfish that resemble bowls of ramen. 
 
A large kappa with a dish that functions as a buzz saw. 
 
Zombies in a filthy bath. 

A bulldog who is also a candy mogul. He always holds contests with fabulous prizes to increase candy sales. He also finds loopholes to prevent Zorori from getting his prize.
 
Duke Bull's assistant. He often rubs his hands together and says .
 
A robot Duke Bull used against Zorori. It uses snow to make icicle missiles.  
 
A dinosaur residing on a remote island. 
 
Son of Dinosaur Mama. He was kidnapped by Mojara. 

A ringmaster bear. 
Fox Family
Three foxes living in a house at the top of a steep hill. 
 
A baby Zorori, Ishishi, and Noshishi saved and looked after. 
 
She worries a lot for her son.  
 
He wears a suit and glasses. 
 
An eagle that rescues Zorori and the boars from a ravine. 

The last of his kind, this monster wreaks havoc on a city, but then goes to live with Dinosaur Mama.

A rabbit news reporter.

Books 11-20
Aliens
 
An alien princess who wants to marry Zorori. 
 
Father of the Alien Princess. 
 
Mother of Alien Princess. 
 
He and Vice Chairman were tasked with finding Zorori. 
 
He enjoys playing with action figures. 
Space Animals
  
They fire poisonous needles. 
  
They stomp victims with their large feet. 
  
They spray poisonous liquid. 
  
They can chew anything with their large mouth with teeth. 
Santas 
  
A Santa who recorded good deeds of a child, which was seen by Zorori. 
  
A red nosed Santa. 
 
A police force of Santas who arrest those that break into a Santa house. 
 
An elementary school soccer team. They challenge Zorori to a match. 
 
A famous soccer player. 
 
A short cat police officer. 
 
A weasel police officer and partner of Chipoli.
 
Warden of the "Animal Punishment Prison". 

A robot with laser eyes owned by the "Animal Punishment Prison". 
 
A very rich girl.
 
Money's butler.
 
An inflatable machine designed to scare people. 
 
A rich frog who collects many rare items. He owned one of two rare Bururu cards. 
  
Dog-esque creatures with piranha-esque jaws. 
  
Michael's swole frog security guards. 
 
A gorilla ninja master who offers free classes, yet the classes require many costly items. 
 
Gorimaru's monkey assistant. 

A black leopard model. Zorori gives her his phone number, but she throws it away. 
 
A dog police officer whose goal is to capture Zorori. His full name is Inuda Takuji 
 
He is very ill. 
 
All of her ancestors were police chiefs for generations. 
Royal Forest Family
Their castle was stolen by five monsters. 
  
He requested Zorori to retrieve his castle. 
 
Wife of the King. 
   
She was put under a sleeping spell. 
Castle Guardians
Monsters who each guard a floor of a castle.  
  
A witch who is trying to lose weight. Zorori gave her medicine that shrinks her. 
  
A thin sumo wrestler. He wears an inflatable suit. 
 
An elderly chicken-esque karate master. He is energetic, yet fragile. 
  
A man in traditional Chinese attire who can launch fireballs. 
  
A gigantic rhino. His weakspot is a boil on the back of his head.

Books 21-30
 
A reindeer basketball player from the Bosque Kingdom who was chosen to be a ski jump competitor at the World Winter Sports Tournament. He lacked confidence because he never skied before. 
 
He chose Dunk to compete in the World Winter Sports Tournament so his country would be famous. 
 
A 62 year old bear security guard. 
 
A pig owner of a store of video games. 
 
A princess Zorori frees from a video game. 
 
Father of Princess Myan. 
 

 

 

 

 

 

 

 

 

 

 

 
The final boss. 
 
A dog archaeologist.  

A baboon scientist who specializes in vegetables. 
 
A bear who raised a ship called the "Bypanic" with his farts. 
 
Leonardo's Bleo's wife. 
 
A wanted criminal mole who tries to frame Zorori for his crimes. His name is an anagram of "mogura"(mole). 
Lion Ryokan Inn 
 
A cat boy who works at the Lion Ryokan Inn. He is a parody of Conan from Case Closed. 
 
Father of Conyan and owner of the Lion Ryokan Inn. 
 
The inn's janitor. 
 
A pig guest who lied about being a detective. 
 
A hippo guest who lied about being a detective. 
 
A guest at the inn. 
 
Madam's pet hamster. 
 
A cat mother who lives in an isolated forested area. 
 
Son of Snow. 
 
He shows up after the cure is consumed. 

Nine cow sisters. They compete in the town's float festival. 

A sparrow music producer. 

Mayor of Goat Goat Town. 

A food critique who rates ramen restaurants. 

A turtle who owns a ramen shop with good noodles, but bad soup.
 
Son of the Owner of Turtle Turtle Ramen.
 
A crane who owns a ramen shop with good soup, but bad noodles. 
 
Daughter of the Owner of Crane Crane Ramen.

Books 31-40
 
A devil who was sent out by Enma to kill Zorori, but failed. He was originally a bear. 
 
The ruler of hell. Because Zorori's name was in Enma's book, Enma made sure he went to Hell. He then gives Zorori a chance to be revived if he manages to pass through seven hells. 
Onis of Hell
 
Hell's gate keeper. 
 
He falls for Zorori's angel disguise. 
 
He explains the rules of Hell. 
 
He carries a bat. 
 
He makes sure people cross the Blood Pond Hell
 
He informed Enma that Zorori cleared the sixth hell. 
 
He is small.
 
He is seen in Anything Goes Hell. 
 
They reside in a hell where they tell freezing oyaji gags. 

A monster who lives in the depths of "Anything Goes Hell". 
 
The only individual to pass through seven hells and be revived. He's a reference to Tetsurō Tamba. 
 
A cat director of a TV station. 
 
One of the commentators of the Monster Major League. He talks a lot. 
 
The other commentator of the Monster Major League. He hardly speaks. 
Horrors
The opponents of the Restorers. Each is roughly named after a different American baseball player.
  
Named after Babe Ruth. The team's pitcher. His glove is attached to a tube attached to his buttocks. His pitches are powered by his farts. 
  
Named after Ty Cobb. A three eyed monster with chicken feet. 
  
Named after Alex Rodriguez. A whiskered green monster. 
  
Named after Sammy Sosa. A three eyed elephant. 
  
Named after Lou Gehrig. A four eyed, bat winged, two tailed, curly haired yellow monster. 
  
Named after Randy Johnson. A three eyed monster with a watermelon like head. 
  
Named after Hank Aaron. A pink monster with a long tongue. 
  
Named after Pete Rose. A sea urchin esque creature. 
  
Named after Pedro Martínez. A reptilian creature with tentacles. 
 
A wizard that finds Zorori and gives her confidence to train harder to be a wizard. She is a 2nd year student at the magic school. Resulting when she reads a book she calls for help of Zorori and he help her with that. She is Milly's younger sister.
 
A bear town leader. 
Wizards of Terror
Minions of the Evil Wizard. 
 
A white goat who pretends to make objects disappear, but actually eats them underneath a cloth. 
 
A black goat and partnet of Goatywhiter. 
 
A cat who hangs on strings. He claims to have telekinesis.  
 
Myarick's rollerskating assistant. 
 
A hippo tied to rope who will crush victims. 
 
Creatures that inhabit Magic Country. 
 
Enma's doctor. 
Art Students
Painters who were deceived by Guramo. 
 
A male elk.
 
A male jaguar. 
 
A female giraffe. 

A cat girl adventurer. 

Archaeologist, adventurer, and Tail's father. 

A wicked dog and inventor who helps Tiger in a plot against Zorori. He created Shirodaruman, Kierunga, and Piranha Dogs. 
 
A pink dinosaur. Husband of Dinosaur Mother. 
 
A pink dinosaur baby born from the egg that Zorori protected. 
 
It tried to eat the dinosaur egg. 
 
Wife of Gorimaru. Gorimaru abandoned her. 
 
They were hungry for dinosaur egg.

Books 41-50

A rabbit elementary school teacher. 

A doctor and father of Arius. 

A bear assistant of Professor Mallow. 

Loukto's sister

Books 51-60

Zorori's wrestling robot. 

Duke Bull's wrestling robot.

A cat spy and love interest of Zorori.

A monkey quiz show host.

Books 61-70

Son of Arthur and Elzie. 

Daughter of Arthur and Elzie. 

A green dragon.

Anime Exclusive

2002 Pilot

Season 1

A rich dog who tries to find the Bukkura Koita, because he wants his daughter to laugh. 

Dalmanian's quite daughter. 

A rock creature that resides in a mountain. 

The mother of the wizard from Book 3. 

Crayon bandits that terrorize the cards. They have 24 other brothers. 

Living cards that live in a remote village. They specialize in making paper, the same material that makes their buildings. 

A pig mayor who stole a statue and framed Zorori. 
 
A maltese princess who befriends Ishishi and Noshishi. 
 
She lets Ishishi and Noshishi stay at the castle. 
 
Maltinu's bulldog supervisor. 
 
Maltinu's cat supervisor. 

A sweet potato farmer. He spent 50 years cultivating sweet potatoes. 
 
A castle with artificial intelligence built by Duke Bull. Zorori won it in a lottery. Zorori told it to clean itself, and then it fell into the ocean.
 
A lone traveling wolf scientist in search of things he wants to build. He is intelligent, strong and resourceful. He and Zorori are equally matched and are friendly rivals. He has his own Bukkura Koita he made himself, but it is no match for Zorori's original. His name is a reference to the Hebrew word for "genius", gaon.
 
A robot replica of Ishishi. 
  
A robot replica of Noshishi. 
  
A robot replica of Zorori that malfunctioned. 
 
Polar bear president of Hail. 
 
Fur seal vice president of Hail. 
 
A penguin fortune teller. 
 
After Zorori Castle fell into the ocean, she claimed it for herself. 
 
Mother of the Mermaid Queen. 
 
The seahorse servant of the Mermaid Princess. 
 
Manager of a fast food restaurant. He encourages his employees to smile. 
 
A robot built by Zorori that makes fast food meals. 

A fisherman apprentice dog. 
 
He and Chinku live together. 
 
A giant squid residing by the harbor. 
 
A fisherman contractor. He demanded that Yo-chan be killed. 

Gaon's mother.

Season 2

Conyan's sister. She is a parody of Ran Mouri from Case Closed. 
Magic School
 

 

 

 

 
Nelly's older sister. She has a crush on Roger.

A character that in some ways resembles Zorori. He never understands Milly's feelings, until she slaps him; they then get together .
People of Gorgeous Town
 

 

:

A cat that delivers pizzas via a moped.

Season 3
 
A ghost guide helping find the 'Minus Eel'. He can escape from his body and move around as a spirit. He is sometimes a great help to Zorori.

A large eel who resides in a deep pond in Ghost Forest. The residents of Ghost Forest call him a guardian deity. 

A small eel and friend of Plus Eel. 

An old wolf and self proclaimed "King of Badness". In his younger days, he would intimidate people as he walked by. After getting hit by a baseball one of the pig siblings, he was then ridiculed. Zorori helps him with revenge. 

Pigs living in a high security house. 

An athletic cat boy Zorori meets at an amusement park. 

An elderly cat woman who became young when she entered the amusement park. 

The comedy trio of Nikoniko Town 

A hippo in a white suit. He's the town's mayor. 

A pig in a red suit. He snaps his fingers. 

A rhino in a blue suit. He plays a ukulele. 

Loosely based on the fairy tail character of the same name. 

A robot dog butler who outperforms Cinderella. 

A baby rhino with super strength. 

A rabbit restaurant owner. Business has not been well for her. 

Sato-chan's tanuki rival. His restaurant has a lot more customers. 

A robot replica of Gaon built by Zorori. 

Children of the Ghost Stairway

A rich sloth lady with a fancy castle. She hosts a marathon rally. The winner of the marathon will become here heir. 

Madam Sequoia's ram butler. 
Marathon Runners

He and Bufan are rivals. 

He and Murasaki are rivals. He wears a helmet with cactus needles. 

A roller skating horse named after Ina Bauer.  

Eight rats who run in unison with their ankles tied together. 

A crab who cuts the rats' leg bands. 

An elephant wearing a shirt with the word "Diet" written on it. He has a stick with a string and banana in front of his face. 

Tatanka Tribe

Kick the Can Players

The Bremens
Four teenagers who aspire to become superheroes. They're a reference to Town Musicians of Bremen and Super Sentai.

A horse and leader of the group.

A dog. 

A cat. 

A chicken. 
Castle Ghosts

Santas

A robot cat maid whose purpose is to serve tons of food.

Season 4
Beat(ビート)
The rival of Zorori that replaced Gaon. He has the ability to blow wind out of his tail.

Movies

Quest for the Mysterious Treasure

G-G-G-Great Adventure

Will Protect It! The Dinosaur Egg

A prehistoric archaeologist cat. She is fascinated with dinosaurs. She's the daughter of a wealthy family.

The Space Heroes

The Secret of Double Z

Comic BunBun Manga

References

External links
 http://www.zorori.jp/contents/chara.html

Kaiketsu Zorori